What Killed Michael Brown? is a 2020 documentary film written and narrated by conservative author Shelby Steele and directed by his filmmaker son, Eli Steele. The film was released on October 16, 2020.

Synopsis

The film addresses race relations in the United States through the 2014 shooting of Michael Brown in Ferguson, Missouri. The film states that "since the 60's, Whites have lived under the accusation that they are racist", and says that the documentary is a "true story" that "liberal mainstream media" does not want you to know.

Production

Steele has opined that there is "poetic truth" concerning the death of Michael Brown. Steele said, "The language—he was 'executed,' he was 'assassinated,' 'hands up, don’t shoot'—it was a stunning example of poetic truth, of the lies that a society can entertain in pursuit of power." Steele additionally said, "In a microcosm, that’s where race relations are today. The truth has no chance. It’s smothered by the politics of victimization."

Reception
Amazon initially rejected it for its streaming service, but later relented amid criticism.

References

External links 
 
 
 

2020 films
2020 documentary films
American documentary films
2020s English-language films
2020s American films